Yoro Lamine Ly (born 27 August 1988) is a Senegalese professional footballer who last played for FC Shirak in Armenian Premier League.

Career

Club
On 5 August 2016, Ly signed a one-year contract, with the option of a second, with Veikkausliiga side FC Ilves.

Career statistics

Club

International

Statistics accurate as of match played 10 May 20180

Honours

Club
Shirak
 Armenian Premier League (1): 2012–13
 Armenian Cup (1): 2011–12

References

External links

1988 births
Living people
Footballers from Dakar
Senegalese footballers
Association football forwards
Primeira Liga players
Liga Portugal 2 players
Segunda Divisão players
Boavista F.C. players
Senegal international footballers
Senegalese expatriate footballers
Expatriate footballers in Portugal
Senegalese expatriate sportspeople in Portugal
BFC Daugavpils players
Latvian Higher League players
Expatriate footballers in Latvia
Senegalese expatriate sportspeople in Latvia
Expatriate footballers in Armenia
Senegalese expatriate sportspeople in Armenia
Armenian Premier League players
FC Shirak players
Expatriate footballers in Finland
Veikkausliiga players
Senegalese expatriate sportspeople in Finland
ASC Niarry Tally players
Israeli Premier League players
Expatriate footballers in Israel
Senegal A' international footballers
2011 African Nations Championship players
Senegalese expatriate sportspeople in Israel
Senegalese expatriate sportspeople in Northern Cyprus
Expatriate footballers in Northern Cyprus